Nitro Stunt Racing is a Racing game developed and edited by French studio GameSeed in 2007 on PC.

Gameplay
Nitro Stunt Racing invents a new racing discipline: the Formula Jet.
The Cars, called F-Jet, are equipped with Nitro reactors which allow them to make crazy jumps while still being able to control them.
Races takes place on different track types : Jump, Looping and Super Cross.

The gameplay is half arcade and half simulation, with a complete physics engine.
You can face up to 15 AI opponents on 3 difficulty levels.
The game engine manage collides and damages.

5 game modes are proposed :
 Training : Testing and training tracks.
 Arcade : In this mode, damages are disabled.
 Duel : Race against a unique opponent
 Course : One race against up to 15 opponents.
 Championship : Full Championship.

The game allows you to share your results online, and have an integrated online ranking system.

Tracks 
11 tracks are available :
 Loopings : Do you like having your head upside down? (normal and reverse)
 Jump It Up : Taste the Jump concept (normal and reverse)
 Hot Rusk : SuperCross (normal and reverse)
 Red Run : High speed jump track
 Hot Rusk : Super Cross (normal and reverse)
 Eagle's park : SuperCross tracks with mad jumps
 Multiplex : The ultimate track of Group 3, a mix of jumps, SuperCross and aerobatics.

After completing a Championship, you can race on those tracks in reverse mode (when available)

External links
 Game Website
 GameSeed

2007 video games
Racing video games
Video games developed in France
Windows games
Windows-only games